Maria Paleologa (19 September 1508 – 15 September 1530) was an Italian noblewoman. 

She was born and died in Casale, and was the eldest child of William IX, Marquess of Montferrat, and Anna d'Alençon. In 1517 her mother betrothed her to Federico II Gonzaga, son of Isabella d'Este, who later became Marquis and Duke of Mantua. The marriage contract was annulled, however, after Federico accused Maria of attempting to poison his mistress Isabella Boschetti, wife of the Count of Calvisano.

Ancestry

1508 births
1530 deaths
Italian nobility
Maria